Antoinette Georgina Cookson (19 December 1918 – 1 October 2011) was a British film, stage and television actress. She died in Sydney, aged 92, on 1 October 2011.

Family
Cookson was the daughter of racing driver Roger Cookson and Sybil Taylor. Her mother, using the pseudonym Sydney Tremayne, was a novelist and contributed to The Tatler. Cookson left Benenden School at the age of 15 to train at RADA. She was the great-granddaughter of the psychiatrist Sir James Crichton-Browne.

She was married four times; she was twice divorced and twice widowed. She had two children, a son and a daughter.

Theatre

After graduating from RADA, she found constant work in both the regions and the West End theatre, appearing alongside Hermione Gingold in the wartime revue Rise Above It at the ‘Q’ (1940) and at the Comedy Theatre (1941). In the same decade, she was in Love Goes to Press, with Irene Worth, at the Embassy Theatre (in Swiss Cottage) and Duchess Theatre (1946) and briefly on Broadway the following year; School for Spinsters (Criterion Theatre, 1947), Portrait of Hickory (Embassy, 1948) and opposite Jack Buchanan in Don't Listen, Ladies! at the St James's Theatre in 1949.

She was no less busy in the 1950s, with appearances in Lionel Shapiro's The Bridge for Bristol Old Vic (1952); 13 for Dinner (Duke of York's Theatre, 1953); the world premier of I Capture the Castle, with Virginia McKenna, Bill Travers and Roger Moore, which opened at Grand Theatre, Blackpool before transferring to the Aldwych Theatre in 1954; and Robert Morley’s Six Months’ Grace (Phoenix Theatre, 1957). Her last stage roles included a national tour of My Fair Lady in 1988 and, alongside Peggy Mount and Jack Douglas, A Breath of Spring in 1990.

Filmography

Film

Television

References

External links
 

1918 births
2011 deaths
20th-century British actresses
Alumni of RADA
British film actresses
British stage actresses
British television actresses
People educated at Benenden School
People from Mevagissey
British expatriates in Australia